Todor Kolev may refer to:
Todor Kolev (actor)
Todor Kolev (footballer born 1942), Bulgarian footballer, FIFA World Cup 1970 player
Todor Kolev (footballer born 1980), Bulgarian football striker
Todor Kolev (footballer born 1989), Bulgarian football winger